Hugh Mackay (ca 1751 – January 28, 1848) was a judge and political figure in New Brunswick. He represented Charlotte in the Legislative Assembly of New Brunswick from 1793 to 1795, from 1802 to 1809 and from 1817 to 1830.

Mackay served in the loyalist forces during the American Revolution, afterwards settling in St. George, New Brunswick. He served as a colonel in the militia there and was senior judge in the Court of  Common Pleas for Charlotte County. Mackay died at the age of 97.

Military Service: Queen's Rangers, May 21, 1778

Death
He died on January 28, 1848, in the Parish of Saint George in the County of Charlotte and Province of New Brunswick.  He was buried at the  St. Mark's Cemetery in St. George.  His tombstone epitaph reads:

"Sacred to the Memory of Hugh MacKay Esq. 
Late of Suther Hall St. George.  
Who Departed this Life 28th January A. D. 1848 in the 97th Year of his Age.  
He was a Native of Sutherlandshire Scotland.  
Served during the American Revolutionary War as an Officer in the Queen’s American Rangers Regiment of Foot.  
And was for many Years Colonel of the Charlotte County Militia.  
And was Leading Member in the House of Assembly of the Province for the said County."

References

Year of birth uncertain
1848 deaths
Members of the Legislative Assembly of New Brunswick
Colony of New Brunswick judges
Colony of New Brunswick people
United Empire Loyalists
Loyalist military personnel of the American Revolutionary War
American emigrants to pre-Confederation New Brunswick
Loyalists in the American Revolution from New York (state)